Tatjana Koķe (born 9 May 1955, Riga, Latvia) is a Latvian politician of the Latvian Farmers' Union party and was Minister of Education and Science of Latvia from 20 December 2007 to 3 November 2010.

References

1955 births
Living people
Politicians from Riga
Latvian Farmers' Union politicians
Ministers of Education and Science of Latvia
Women government ministers of Latvia
University of Latvia alumni
Academic staff of the University of Latvia

21st-century Latvian women politicians